The 1989–90 Yugoslav Second League season was the 44th season of the Second Federal League, the second level association football competition of SFR Yugoslavia, since its establishment in 1946.

Teams
A total of twenty teams contested the league, including fourteen sides from the 1988–89 season, two clubs relegated from the 1988–89 Yugoslav First League and four sides promoted from the Inter-Republic Leagues played in the 1988–89 season. The league was contested in a double round robin format, with each club playing every other club twice, for a total of 38 rounds. Two points were awarded for a win, while in case of a draw - penalty kicks were taken and the winner of the shootout was awarded one point while the loser got nothing.

Čelik and Napredak Kruševac were relegated from the 1988–89 Yugoslav First League after finishing in the bottom two places of the league table. The four clubs promoted to the second level were Iskra, Mladost Lučani, Rudar Ljubija and Zemun.

League table

See also
1989–90 Yugoslav First League
1989–90 Yugoslav Cup

References

Yugoslav Second League seasons
Yugo
2